Víctor Jiménez (born 4 February 1984) is a Spanish racing driver from Madrid, Spain currently competing in the 2014 Porsche Carrera Cup Great Britain driving for the Redline Racing team, in the Pro class. In prior years, Jiménez was in the Pro-Am 1 class.

Racing career

Formula Palmer Audi
Jiménez competed in the second half of the 2010 Formula Palmer Audi championship. He finished the championship in 16th place with 77 points, with his best result being a 10th place finish at Silverstone.

Formula Renault BARC
2011 saw Jiménez compete in the Protyre Formula Renault BARC championship, driving for the Fortec Motorsport team. The season was contested over 12 rounds at 6 meetings. Notable highlights for Jiménez were a sixth place finish at Donington Park in round two and fastest lap at Brands Hatch in round four. He finished the championship in 16th place with 65 points. For the post-season Formula Renault BARC Winter Series, Jiménez moved to Hillspeed, and took five podium finishes – three second places and two third places – over the six races at Snetterton and Rockingham; the results were sufficient to win the championship with 156 points.

Porsche Carrera Cup Great Britain

In 2012 Jiménez joined the Porsche Carrera Cup GB with Redline Racing in the Pro-Am 1 class, where he finished 4th in class and 12th overall with 92 points. His highest place race finish overall was eighth place, on several occasions; however the class results were more successful including three wins, two second places, nine third places, three fastest laps and three pole positions. He remained with Redline for a second season in 2013, and became Pro-Am 1 class champion and finished 6th in the overall classification with 194 points. He recorded two overall podiums at Croft and Rockingham, as well as achieving ten class wins.

In 2014 Jiménez is competing in the main professional class with Redline Racing. Whilst entrant numbers have been lower for this season, Jiménez is currently third in the drivers' championship, with two podiums – a second place and a third place – in the opening three meetings.

References

External links

1984 births
Living people
Spanish racing drivers
Porsche Carrera Cup GB drivers
Formula Renault BARC drivers
Fortec Motorsport drivers
Formula Palmer Audi drivers